The Cobweb is a 1955 American Eastmancolor MGM drama film. It was directed by Vincente Minnelli, and based on a novel by William Gibson. The film stars Richard Widmark, Lauren Bacall, Charles Boyer, and Gloria Grahame

Plot
The opening credits are followed by the following onscreen words: "The trouble began ---"

Dr. Stewart McIver (Richard Widmark) is now in charge of a psychiatric institution, one run for many years by medical director Dr. Douglas Devanal (Charles Boyer).

McIver must address the needs of a number of disturbed patients, among them Steven Holte (John Kerr), a possibly suicidal artist, and the self-loathing Mr. Capp (Oscar Levant). All of his responsibilities keep McIver so busy that his wife, Karen (Gloria Grahame), feels increasingly frustrated and ignored.

When new drapes are needed for the clinic's library, the dour and penny-pinching Victoria Inch (Lillian Gish) orders unattractive ones. Karen McIver takes it upon herself to buy a more expensive and colorful set instead, gaining the approval of the chairman of the board Regina Mitchell-Smythe (Mabel Albertson), but without the knowledge of her husband. What should be an insignificant matter is complicated further by Dr. McIver giving the patients, principally Stevie, permission to design and create the new drapes themselves.

Personalities clash. Dr. Devanal, who has a drinking problem, has been having an affair with his secretary Miss Cobb (Adele Jergens), and makes a clumsy pass at McIver's wife as well. McIver begins to fall in love with Meg Rinehart (Lauren Bacall), a member of his staff. Miss Inch privately schemes to expose the unseemly behavior of Devanal at the next meeting of the board and issues a veiled threat to do so to McIver as well, while Devanal's wife, Edna (Fay Wray), mistakenly believes McIver to be behind the plot to discredit her husband.

Having felt stable enough to go on a date with Sue Brett (Susan Strasberg), another patient, Stevie Holte is very upset to discover that new drapes have been installed, not the ones his artwork was meant to inspire. He disappears, causing a search party to look for him and McIver to fear a suicide. At the next board meeting, Dr. Devanal submits his resignation to the board.

After the meeting, the McIvers agree to work on their marriage and head home where they find Stevie having survived his attempt at suicide.

At the end of the film, the words appear onscreen:"The trouble was over ---"

Cast

 Richard Widmark as Dr. Stewart McIver
 Lauren Bacall as Meg Rinehart
 Charles Boyer as Dr. Devanal
 Gloria Grahame as Karen McIver
 Lillian Gish as Victoria Inch
 John Kerr as Steven W. Holte
 Susan Strasberg as Sue Brett
 Oscar Levant as Mr. Capp
 Tommy Rettig as Mark McIver
 Paul Stewart as Dr. Otto Wolff
 Jarma Lewis as Lois Y. Demuth
 Adele Jergens as Miss Cobb
 Edgar Stehli as Mr. Holcolmb
 Sandra Descher as Rosemary
 Bert Freed as Abe Irwin
 Mabel Albertson as Regina Mitchell-Smythe
 Fay Wray as Edna Devanal
 Oliver Blake as Curly
 Olive Carey as Mrs. O'Brien
 Eve McVeagh as Mrs. Shirley Irwin
 Virginia Christine as Sally

Music
The score was composed, conducted, and orchestrated by Leonard Rosenman. The music distinguishes itself by "having the first predominantly twelve-tone score ever written for a motion picture".

The first release of portions of the score was on MGM Records on LP in 1957. The complete score in stereo was issued on CD in 2003, on Film Score Monthly records.

Release
According to MGM records, the film earned $1,385,000 in the US and Canada, and $593,000 elsewhere, resulting in a loss of $1,141,000.

It was released on DVD as part of the Warner Archive Collection on January 18, 2011.

See also
List of American films of 1955
 Lillian Gish filmography

References

External links
 
 
 
 
 Various LP and CD releases of music from the film

1955 films
1955 drama films
Metro-Goldwyn-Mayer films
Films scored by Leonard Rosenman
Films directed by Vincente Minnelli
Films about psychiatry
American drama films
Films based on American novels
CinemaScope films
1950s English-language films
1950s American films